Claytonville is an unincorporated community in Iroquois County, Illinois, United States.

Geography
Claytonville is located at  (40.566944, -87.822222), a little under four miles east of the town of Cissna Park and about two miles west of Goodwine.  An east–west line of the Chicago and Eastern Illinois Railroad used to pass through the community but is now defunct.

The small waterway Whiskey Creek runs along the north edge of town, flowing east to meet with Fountain Creek north of Goodwine.

References

External links
Iroquois County

Unincorporated communities in Iroquois County, Illinois
Unincorporated communities in Illinois